This article shows the rosters of all participating teams at the 2007 FIVB Volleyball Women's World Cup in Japan.

The following is the Brazil roster in the 2007 FIVB World Cup.

The following is the Cuba roster in the 2007 FIVB World Cup.

The following is the Dominican Republic roster in the 2007 FIVB World Cup.

The following is the Italy roster in the 2007 FIVB World Cup.

The following is the Japan roster in the 2007 FIVB World Cup.
 Head coach: Shoichi Yanagimoto

The following is the Kenya roster in the 2007 FIVB World Cup.

The following is the Peru roster in the 2007 FIVB World Cup.

The following is the Poland roster in the 2007 FIVB World Cup.

The following is the Serbia roster in the 2007 FIVB World Cup.

The following is the South Korea roster in the 2007 FIVB World Cup.

The following is the Thailand roster in the 2007 FIVB World Cup.

The following is the United States roster in the 2007 FIVB World Cup.

See also
2007 FIVB Volleyball Men's World Cup squads

References

External links
Official website

F
S
Volleyball qualification for the 2008 Summer Olympics
Vol